Michael Seamon (January 15, 1960 – 2017) was an American professional bridge player from Miami Beach, Florida.

Born to bridge players Rita and William Seamon, Michael was the youngest of three children. His sister, Janice Seamon-Molson, is also a nationally ranked bridge player. On September 3, 1992, his son Kevin William Seamon was born.

Seamon died suddenly in 2017 of natural causes.

Bridge accomplishments

Awards

 Mott-Smith Trophy (1) 1993

Wins

 North American Bridge Championships (16)
 Silodor Open Pairs (1) 1999 
 Blue Ribbon Pairs (1) 2003 
 Grand National Teams (6) 1997, 1999, 2000, 2002, 2004, 2014 
 Jacoby Open Swiss Teams (3) 1992, 1993, 2005 
 Mitchell Board-a-Match Teams (1) 2011 
 Chicago Mixed Board-a-Match (1) 1994 
 Reisinger (3) 2007, 2010, 2011 
 Spingold (1) 2015

Runners-up

 North American Bridge Championships
 Lebhar IMP Pairs (1) 1989 
 Grand National Teams (2) 2003, 2005 
 Vanderbilt (2) 1997, 1998 
 Reisinger (1) 1996 
 Spingold (3) 1987, 1997, 2006

Notes

External links

American contract bridge players
Living people
1960 births
Place of birth missing (living people)
Date of birth missing (living people)
People from Miami Beach, Florida